George Rollo Hayman (4 May 1925 – 3 April 2008) was a Rhodesian farmer and politician. A member of the House of Assembly, he served in several portfolios as a member of the Cabinet of Rhodesia under Prime Minister Ian Smith. Born in the United Kingdom, he moved to Southern Rhodesia at age four and served as a Royal Air Force pilot in World War II.

Elected to Parliament in 1958 as a member of the United Federal Party, he was a founding member of the Rhodesian Front party in 1962. He joined the Cabinet in 1976 upon being appointed Minister of Agriculture. In 1977, he was named Minister of Local Government and Housing and Minister of Internal Affairs. In December 1978, he resigned from the Cabinet, from Parliament, and from the party, protesting the Prime Minister's rejection of British-American plans for Rhodesia's transition to majority rule. He ran as an independent in the by-election for his former seat in Parliament, but lost. He soon moved to South Africa, where he lived until his death.

Early life and education 
Hayman was born on 4 May 1925 to Samuel James Rollo Hayman and Ethel Elizabeth Burnell Pollard. Born in Banbury, Oxfordshire, United Kingdom, he moved to Southern Rhodesia with his parents in 1929, when he was age four. He was educated at Plumtree School in Plumtree, Matabeleland. He matriculated at the University of the Witwatersrand in Johannesburg, South Africa, graduating honors with a Bachelor of Science in soil conservation.

In 1943, he joined the Royal Air Force as a flight sergeant. He served during World War II as a pilot with the Transport Command in Burma.

Farming career 
Hayman returned to Southern Rhodesia in 1949, taking up work as a conservation and extension officer until 1955. He later purchased land and took up farming in Shamva, a town in the northern Mashonaland region. He went on to serve as chairman of the Shamva Farmers' Association, chairman of the Shamva Parents' Association, and director of the Rhodesian Farmers' Syndicates.

Political career 
Hayman was elected to Parliament for the Shamva constituency in the 1958 Southern Rhodesian elections, as a member of the United Federal Party. He, along with Ian Smith, Lance Smith, and four others, resigned from the UFP on 19 April 1961 over the party's position on constitutional proposals for Southern Rhodesia.

In 1962, he became a founding member of the right-wing Rhodesian Front party, which opposed transitioning Southern Rhodesia to independence under black majority rule. Hayman ran for reelection as the Rhodesian Front candidate for the Mazoe constituency in the 1962 elections. He won with 56% of the vote, defeating the United Federal Party candidate Neil Patrick Hammond. At a 2 December 1962 meeting, the Rhodesian Front parliamentary caucus met and returned a vote of no confidence in Prime Minister Winston Field. Hayman was one of only two RF members to vote against the motion, alongside Jack Howman.

Hayman won reelection in 1965, 1970, 1974, and 1977, each time with more than 80% of the vote. In 1973, he was appointed Deputy Minister of Internal Affairs. He joined Prime Minister Ian Smith's Cabinet in 1976 when he was named Minister of Agriculture. In 1977, he became minister of two portfolios, Local Government and Housing and Internal Affairs. In those offices, he served alongside black co-ministers appointed as a result of the 1978 Internal Settlement. Hayman's co-Minister of Local Government and Housing was Kayisa Ndiweni, followed by James Chikerema. For Internal Affairs, the co-minister was Byron Hove, followed by Kayisa Ndiweni.

Resignation and special election 
On 27 December 1978, Hayman resigned from his cabinet posts, from Parliament, and from the Rhodesian Front. He charged that Prime Minister Ian Smith was "leading Rhodesians into a trap" by rejecting Western plans for majority rule. Hayman favored the plan put forward by the United States and United Kingdom in which Rhodesia would revert to British rule under a commissioner, assisted by United Nations peacekeepers, who would oversee elections and the transition to black rule. He thought that any black government elected under Smith's plan, in which 28% of the government was to be reserved for whites, would collapse or be overthrown by guerrillas, resulting in Marxist rule in Rhodesia. In a political meeting in Enkeldoorn, Hayman also argued that Smith was misleading the country by claiming that Rhodesia had a good change of gaining international recognition following the elections. Additionally, he thought it would be impossible to organize the elections by December 31, the date stipulated by the Internal Settlement.

The resignation of Hayman, a staunch conservative and an close ally of the Prime Minister, was seen as a blow to the transitional government. Prime Minister Ian Smith later said that he had asked Hayman to resign when he learned he was planning to leave Rhodesia. He said:

The day he resigned, Hayman announced that he would run as an independent for his former seat in Parliament in the special election. The byelection, held on 6 February 1979, was the last election conducted before the advent of the new constitution. Hayman lost the election with 20% of the vote to Cecil Millar, the Rhodesian Front candidate. Soon after, he moved to South Africa.

Personal life and death 
Hayman died, aged 82, on 3 April 2008 at home in the Amberglen retirement community in Howick, KwaZulu-Natal, South Africa. He was married to Madeline Elizabeth, with two children, one son and one daughter. He played tennis and golf.

Electoral history

See also 

 List of Royal Air Force personnel

References 

1925 births
British emigrants to Rhodesia
Conservationists
Independent politicians in Zimbabwe
Members of the National Assembly of Zimbabwe
Members of the Parliament of Rhodesia
Members of the Legislative Assembly of Southern Rhodesia
People from Banbury
Rhodesian emigrants to South Africa
Rhodesian farmers
Rhodesian Front politicians
Rhodesian people of British descent
Rhodesian politicians
Royal Air Force airmen
Royal Air Force pilots of World War II
South African people of English descent
Southern Rhodesian military personnel of World War II
United Federal Party politicians
University of the Witwatersrand alumni
White Rhodesian people
2008 deaths